These are the official results of the Women's Long Jump event at the 1991 IAAF World Championships in Tokyo, Japan. There were a total of 31 participating athletes, with two qualifying groups and the final held on Sunday August 25, 1991.

Medalists

Schedule
All times are Japan Standard Time (UTC+9)

Records

Results

Final

Qualifying round
Held on Saturday 1991-08-24

See also
 1988 Women's Olympic Long Jump (Seoul)
 1990 Women's European Championships Long Jump (Split)
 1992 Women's Olympic Long Jump (Barcelona)
 1993 Women's World Championships Long Jump (Stuttgart)

References
 Results

L
Long jump at the World Athletics Championships
1991 in women's athletics